Massih Wassey (born 18 June 1988) is a Canadian professional soccer player who plays as a midfielder for Sportfreunde Lotte.

Career
Wassey began his career in his hometown for ESV Münster in 1996 and signed for VfL Wolbeck in June 2001. After spending two years in VfL Wolbeck's youth squad, Wassey was scouted by Preußen Münster in the summer of 2003. After playing for only half a year, Wassey joined the youth squad of Rot-Weiss Ahlen in January 2004, and then signed a youth contract for VfL Wolfsburg in July 2005.

After this, Wassey returned to the youth squad of Preußen Münster, and was promoted to the senior squad after one year. After two years in the senior squad of Preußen Münster, Massih signed for FC Schalke 04 in July 2005. Wassey was the regular playmaker for the reserve team. On 2 February 2011, he signed for Fortuna Düsseldorf II. After half a season each with Fortuna, then Eintracht Rheine, he signed for SV Waldhof Mannheim in January 2012. Eighteen months later he signed for SC Wiedenbrück 2000.

Massey moved to SC Paderborn 07 in summer 2017.

International career
Wassey made his debut for Canada men's national soccer team in a friendly match against Jamaica on 31 January 2010.

Personal life
Wassey was born to a German father and an Afghan mother in Münster. Massih Wassey obtained a Canadian passport after his mother married a Canadian. Owing to this, he holds Canadian and German citizenship.

Honours
 2009: Westfalenpokal
 2008: Westfalenpokal
 2008: Oberliga Westfalen

References

External links
 
 
 

1988 births
Living people
Sportspeople from Münster
Canadian soccer players
Canadian expatriate soccer players
Afghan footballers
German footballers
Association football midfielders
SC Preußen Münster players
FC Schalke 04 II players
Fortuna Düsseldorf II players
SV Waldhof Mannheim players
SC Wiedenbrück 2000 players
Borussia Dortmund II players
SC Paderborn 07 players
Sportfreunde Lotte players
Regionalliga players
3. Liga players
Canadian people of Afghan descent
Canadian people of German descent
Canada men's international soccer players
German people of Afghan descent
Footballers from North Rhine-Westphalia
People with acquired Canadian citizenship
FC Eintracht Rheine players